Engage or variation, may refer to:

 Engagement in preparation for marriage
 Engagé, 18th-19th century engaged contract workers
 Engage (organisation), a UK-based political organization 
 Engage (visual arts), the UK National Association for Gallery Education
 Engagement (military) during a military battle or a shootout

See also

 N-Gage (disambiguation)
 N scale, the model railway N gauge
 Engaged (disambiguation)
 Engagement (disambiguation)
 Disengage (disambiguation)
 Disengagement (disambiguation)
 Rules of Engagement (disambiguation)
 
 Jean-Luc Picard, captain of the USS Enterprise (NCC-1701-D) in Star Trek